Stand By Your Screen was a 1968 play written by Roy Minton and directed by Alan Clarke.

Plot
Christopher Gritter John Neville revolts against the suburban conformity of his parents.

Performances
First broadcast London Weekend Television 8 December 1968. It was 52 mins long.

Cast
John Neville as Christopher Gritter
Ann Bell as Bess Hogg
Cyril Luckham as Norman Gritter
Patricia Lawrence as May Green

References

External links
 

ITV (TV network) original programming
1968 plays
1968 in England
London Weekend Television shows
English-language television shows